Jason Alexander Pinnock (born June 30, 1999) is an American football safety for the New York Giants of the National Football League (NFL). He played college football at Pittsburgh.

Professional career

New York Jets
Pinnock was selected by the New York Jets in the fifth round, 175th overall, of the 2021 NFL Draft. On May 7, 2021, Pinnock officially signed with the Jets. He was waived on August 30, 2022.

New York Giants
On August 31, 2022, Pinnock was claimed off waivers by the New York Giants.

References

External links
Pittsburgh bio

1999 births
Living people
New York Jets players
New York Giants players
People from Windsor, Connecticut
Pittsburgh Panthers football players
Players of American football from Connecticut
Sportspeople from Hartford County, Connecticut
American football cornerbacks